32 Zel/Planet Shrooms is the debut double extended play by American rapper Denzel Curry. It was released on June 9, 2015 by C9 Records. The album features guest appearances from Mike Dece, Twelve'len, Big Rube, Nell, J.K. the Reaper, Leonardo Safari, and Fortebowie. The album was supported by the two singles: "Ultimate" and "Ice Age" featuring Mike Dece. The album also featured notable producers such as Ronny J and Nick León.

On October 14, 2016, 32 Zel/Planet Shrooms along with Nostalgic 64 was removed from iTunes and streaming services and was later replaced by Denzel's second studio album Imperial. He stated that they would return soon and be remastered, though as of February 2023, Nostalgic 64 and Planet Shrooms are still absent from iTunes and Spotify. On September 22, 2017, a remastered version of 32 Zel with re-recorded vocals was released to iTunes and streaming services. Notable differences include a remix version of "Ultimate" featuring (Juicy J) and "Ice Age", which now lacks a Mike Dece feature, with whom Curry had a public falling out.

Track listing
Credits adapted from Apple Music and Genius.

Notes
  signifies a co-producer
  signifies an additional producer
 "Delusional Shone" features background vocals by Vares of Twelve'len.

References

External links
 

Hip hop EPs
Denzel Curry albums
2015 debut EPs
Albums produced by Ronny J